Johannes M. Schröder (born 3 October 1991) is a German organist, composer and Catholic church musician. After several years responsible for the church music at the Westerwälder Dom, he moved to St. Bonifatius, Wiesbaden. He is also a lecturer and a music editor.

Life 
Born in Hachenburg in the Westerwald, Schröder received instructions in piano and composition from age 12, and began learning the organ a year later. He studied liturgical and concert organ playing with the Würzburg Cathedral organist Stefan Schmidt from 2009 to 2012. He also received organ instructions from Peter Domjak in Essen and Frédéric Blanc in Paris.

Schröder studied Catholic church music and concert organ at the Hochschule für Musik und Tanz Köln from 2011 to 2017, specifically literature play and improvisation with Johannes Geffert and Thierry Mechler, and composition (Tonsatz) with Johannes Schild.

In May 2014, Schröder became church musician (hauptamtlicher Kirchenmusiker) at St. Bonifatius in Wirges, also known as Westerwälder Dom. He has played concerts in cathedral churches of Cologne, Limburg, Riga and Speyer, and at the Kölner Philharmonie. He was the organist for the world premiere of Peter Reulein's oratorio Laudato si' at the Limburg Cathedral on 6 November 2016.

He was promoted in February 2022. His research focus is on French music around 1900. He has been a lecturer of harmony and work analysis (Harmonielehre und Werkanalyse) at the Wiesbadener Musikakademie from April 2014. Succeeding Gabriel Dessauer, he became responsible for church music at St. Bonifatius, Wiesbaden, on 1 January 2022.

He chose for his first choral concert on 3 October 2022 Verdi's Messa di Requiem in an arrangement for small ensemble. The Chor von St. Bonifatius performed with soloists Talia Or, Silvia Hauer, Sung Min Song and Johannes Hill, and members of the Hessisches Staatsorchester. On 11 December 2022 he conducted the Oratorio de Noël by Saint-Saëns.

Works 
Schröder has composed sacred music for choir and organ, including chorale preludes for the Gotteslob hymnal. His oratorio Beati Pauperes. Selig, die arm sind vor Gott was commissioned in 2019 by the Diocese of Limburg to commemorate  Katharina Kaspar, a nun from Dernbach in the Westerwald (now in the Diocese of Limburg) who was canonised as a saint in 2018. Its text, written by Helmut Schlegel, is based on the Beatitudes. The Elberfelder Requiem was written for a commission to write contemporary settings for the Latin liturgical chants for All Souls' Day. His compositions were published by Carus-Verlag,  and Dehm Verlag.

 Chorale preludes for Gotteslob
 Missa simplex für Chor (SATB) and organ, B-Note, Hagen im Bremischen, .
 Elberfelder Requiem for choir (SATB), cello and organ, B-Note Musikverlag, Hagen im Bremischen 2012, .
 Beati Pauperes. Selig, die arm sind vor Gott, oratorio for soloists, choir, children's choir and orchestra, Dehm-Verlag, Limburg 2019, .

Thesis

Discography

References

External links 

 
 Johannes Schröder  bodensee-musikversand.de
 
 

 

German composers
Catholic liturgical composers
People from Westerwaldkreis
German classical organists
1991 births
Living people